Survivor: Odisejev Otok is the first season of the Croatian version of the Swedish show Expedition Robinson, or Survivor and it aired 2005. Having been influenced by the success of the Croatian version of Big Brother, channel HRT decided to launch a Croatian version of Survivor which aired from May 12, 2005 to July 7, 2005. An immediate twist this season was that each tribe was forced to take part in an elimination challenge on day one of the competition. As Ivan Krželj of the "Ammos" tribe (named after the Greek word for sand) and Ana Marija Bojko of the "Petros" tribe (named after the Greek word for rock) lost the challenge they were both eliminated from the competition. Throughout the rest of the pre-merge portion of the competition the tribes battled for a majority when the merge arrived. As many of them were considered weak by their tribes, most of the women were eliminated during this portion of the competition. When the merge arrived, the two tribes became one known as "Zoi" and the former original members of Ammos found themselves out numbered six to four. Due to this, all of the former members of Ammos, with the exception of Silvija Zelko, were almost immediately eliminated. When it came time for the final four, the contestants competed in two challenges in order to determine the final two. As the winner of the first challenge, Vazmenko Pervanu chose to eliminate the only non-former Petros member Silvija Zelko. Kristina Sesar, Vazmenko Pervanu, and Vedran Rubrik Šehić were then forced to compete in a second challenge which Vedran Rubrik Šehić won and chose to eliminate Kristina Sesar, who many considered to be the villain of the season. Unlike most versions of Survivor, the public, not the jury, chose the winner and despite the fact that Vedran Rubrik Šehić won the jury vote by a margin of 4-3, it was Vazmenko Pervanu who won this season with a public vote of 68.23% to Vedran Rubrik Šehić's 31.77%. Due to low ratings Survivor was cancelled following this season.

The Croatian version of Survivor received a second season in the form of the 4th season of Survivor Srbija, and a new season is set to be released in 2022.

Finishing order

The game

In the case of multiple tribes or castaways who win reward or immunity, they are listed in order of finish, or alphabetically where it was a team effort; where one castaway won and invited others, the invitees are in brackets.

 All contestants from both tribes had to pull one name out of the hat. Two contestants with the highest number of "votes" (one from each tribe) were automatically eliminated, but were left as a backup in case someone quits.

 There was no immunity challenge in this cycle due to Iva's removal from the game. Subsequently, there was no Tribal Council either.

 There was no Reward Challenge due to tribal merge.

Voting history

 Iva was evacuated due to medical reasons.

External links
https://web.archive.org/web/20050613010452/http://www.tportal.hr/survivor/fset.html (Official Site Archive)
http://www.index.hr/xmag/clanak/vazmenko-pobjednik-survivora/273637.aspx
http://www.index.hr/xmag/clanak/krece-prvi-hrvatski-quotsurvivorquot-predstavljamo-kandidate/264508.aspx

Croatia
Croatian reality television series
2005 Croatian television seasons
Television shows filmed in Croatia